Mark Fish is an American television producer and writer and actor.

Actor
Fish has appeared in bit part roles on shows including The O.C., Ed, Law & Order and The Sopranos. He was an actor in the TV show Trinity, and a supporting actor in the film Paging Emma.

Writer
Fish was story editor for Damages and has also written episodes for television shows The O.C. and The Inside.

References

External links

American male film actors
American male television actors
American television producers
American television writers
American male television writers
Living people
Place of birth missing (living people)
Year of birth missing (living people)